Heliot Lemuel Ramos Lebrón (born September 7, 1999) is a Puerto Rican professional baseball center fielder for the San Francisco Giants of Major League Baseball (MLB). The Giants selected Ramos in the first round, with the 19th overall selection, of the 2017 MLB draft. He made his MLB debut in 2022.

Career

Amateur career
Ramos attended Leadership Christian Academy in Guaynabo, Puerto Rico. He played for the Las Lomas Potros travel ball club in Puerto Rico. Ramos was the Most Valuable Player of the 2016 Under Armour All-America Baseball Game, a showcase of high school juniors and seniors that was held at Wrigley Field on July 23, 2016. He committed to play baseball at Florida International University prior to signing his professional contract.

Professional career

2017-18
The San Francisco Giants selected Ramos in the first round, with the 19th overall selection, of the 2017 MLB draft. He signed for a signing bonus of $3,101,700.

Ramos began his professional career in 2017 with the Arizona League Giants of the Rookie-level Arizona League, based at the team's minor league complex in Scottsdale, Arizona. He ranked was first in the league with a .645 slugging percentage, 2nd with a .348 batting average, 8th with a .404 on-base percentage, 2nd with a 1.049 on base plus slugging percentage (OPS), and tied for 7th with six home runs in 138 at bats. Following the season, Baseball America named Ramos a 2017 Rookie-Level Classification All-Star, and he was one of only three outfielders selected among players in the four Rookie-level leagues. In the Giants' 2017 draft class, Baseball America rated Ramos as the Best Power Hitter, Best Defensive Player, and Best Athlete, and as having the Best Pro Debut. He was also named an Arizona League post-season All Star, and an MiLB.com Organization All Star. Ramos participated in the Giants' Instructional League following the 2017 season.

In 2018, Ramos played with the Augusta GreenJackets of the Single-A South Atlantic League. He hit .245/.313/.396 with 11 home runs and 52 RBIs, and 8 steals in 15 attempts, in 485 at bats over 124 games. He was a 2018 Futures Game selection.

2019-22
He began the 2019 season with the San Jose Giants of the High-A California League. Ramos was named to the 2019 All-Star Futures Game. In August, the Giants promoted Ramos, 19 years of age at the time, to the Richmond Flying Squirrels of the Double-A Eastern League. Over 389 at bats in 102 games between the two teams, Ramos slashed .290/.369/.481 with 16 home runs and 55 RBIs, and 8 steals in 18 attempts. He was a Futures Game selection. He was named a California League mid-season and post-season All Star, and an MiLB.com Organization All Star. In the Arizona Fall League he batted .185/.250/.262 in 65 at bats. 

In 2021, Ramos was selected to play in the All-Star Futures Game. In July 2021, Ramos was promoted to the Triple-A Sacramento River Cats. Across 449 at bats, Ramos hit .254/.323/.416 with 15 steals in 19 attempts. Ramos was added to the 40-man roster following the season on November 19, 2021. He was ranked # 5 in the Giants 2022 MLB Prospect Rankings.

In 2022, playing for Triple-A Sacramento, he batted .227/.305/.349 in 427 at bats, with 61 runs, 11 home runs, and 45 RBIs. He played 49 games in center field, 33 in right field, 21 in left field, and 8 at DH. The Giants promoted Ramos to the major leagues on April 10, 2022. With the Giants, he batted 2-for-20.

2023
On March 10, 2023, Ramos was optioned to Triple-A Sacramento to begin the 2023 season.

Personal life
Ramos is the younger brother of Héctor Ramos, a professional soccer player and the all-time top scorer of the Puerto Rican national team. He is also the younger brother of Henry Ramos, also a professional baseball outfielder, who made his MLB debut in 2021 with the Arizona Diamondbacks.

References

External links

1999 births
Living people
People from Maunabo, Puerto Rico
Major League Baseball players from Puerto Rico
Major League Baseball outfielders
San Francisco Giants players
Arizona League Giants players
Augusta GreenJackets players
San Jose Giants players
Richmond Flying Squirrels players
Scottsdale Scorpions players
Sacramento River Cats players
Cangrejeros de Santurce (baseball) players